Falkson is a surname. Notable people with the surname include:

Ferdinand Falkson (1820–1900), German physician and writer
Rodney Falkson (1941–2019), South African cricketer